Henry Peters (21 December 1827) was the Member of Parliament for Oxford from May 1796 to 1802.

He was the second son of George Peters, a merchant in the Russia Company and was educated at Lincoln's Inn (1777) and  St John's College, Cambridge.

He became a banker, partner in the firm of Masterman & Co., and served as a Director of the South Sea Company in 1790.  He was backed for Parliament by a group in Oxford opposed to local aristocratic interests and sat as MP for Oxford from 1796 to 1802. He was appointed High Sheriff of Surrey for 1818–19.

He married Charlotte Mary, the daughter of Lt.-Gen. George Morrison of Sion Hill, nr. Barnet, Middlesex, with whom he had 5 sons and 5 daughters.

References
R. G. Thorne, The House of Commons, 1790-1820, Volume 1 (1986), p. 781.
 

1760s births
1827 deaths
Alumni of St John's College, Cambridge
Members of Lincoln's Inn
British bankers
Members of the Parliament of Great Britain for English constituencies
British MPs 1796–1800
Members of the Parliament of the United Kingdom for English constituencies
UK MPs 1801–1802
High Sheriffs of Surrey